Barea confusella is a moth of the family Oecophoridae. It was described by Francis Walker in 1864. It is found in New Zealand and Australia in (Queensland, New South Wales and Victoria).

The wingspan is about 20mm. The forewings have a black and white pattern. The hindwings are silky fawn.

The larvae feed on dead sapwood, boring into dead trees and living in tunnels under the bark. It has been recorded feeding on dead wood of Eucalyptus pilularis and Prunus armeniaca. It has also been observed feeding dead leaf litter and the tubers of Dahlia species.

References

 Barea confusella in insectin

Moths described in 1864
Oecophoridae
Moths of New Zealand
Taxa named by Francis Walker (entomologist)